Pawling station is a commuter rail stop on the Metro-North Railroad's Harlem Line, located in Pawling, New York.

History
Though the New York and Harlem Railroad ran through the community as far back as the late-1840s, Pawling didn't receive a passenger station until the New York Central and Hudson River Railroad built one in 1881, and continued to serve as it was incorporated into a village in 1893. It was one of the stations on the Harlem Line to serve the Berkshire Hills Express and other limited stop trains that went from New York City all the way to Pittsfield, Massachusetts and North Adams, Massachusetts in the Berkshires. Such through trains were replaced by shuttle transfers in 1950.

As with the rest of the Harlem Division, the station became part of Penn Central Railroad upon New York Central's merger with Pennsylvania Railroad in 1968. Penn Central's continuous financial despair throughout the 1970s forced them to turn over their commuter service to the Metropolitan Transportation Authority, which continued through Penn Central's acquisition by Conrail in 1976. The ticket agent/office was closed on March 11, 1977. The station depot burned on November 30, 1984. Today it is used by the local chamber of commerce.

Station layout
The station consists of a four-car-long high-level side platform to the east of the track.

Notes

References

External links

 Getting to the Appalachian Trail
 Pawling NYC station (Dynamic Depot Maps)
 Tuesday Tour of Pawling Station (I Ride the Harlem Line)
 Station from Google Maps Street View

Metro-North Railroad stations in New York (state)
Former New York Central Railroad stations
Pawling, New York
Railway stations in Dutchess County, New York
1848 establishments in New York (state)
Railway stations in the United States opened in 1848
Transportation in Dutchess County, New York